Melnica is a village in the municipality of Čaška, North Macedonia.

History 
The ancestors of Melnica inhabitants were Mijaks who converted to Islam during the 16th century and migrated from the Mala Reka region in the Debar area at the end of the 17th until the 19th centuries to central Macedonia establishing villages such as Melnica. In the 20th century, migration occurred by Melnica inhabitants to Turkey in particular to the city Akhisar with a few other families going to Bursa, Ankara and Edirne.

Demographics
In his 1927 map of Macedonia, German explorer Leonhard Schultze-Jena shows Melnica as Muslim Bulgarian. The village has traditionally been inhabited by a Macedonian Muslim (Torbeš) population that speaks Macedonian. Though most Macedonian Muslims are Sunni, in Melnica followers of Sufi Islam are present attached to various Sufi orders such as the Melami, Halveti and Bektashi. In the 1960s there were 3 Muslim Albanian households in the village.

According to the 2021 census, the village had a total of 775 inhabitants. Ethnic groups in the village include:
Turks 368
Macedonians 179
Albanians 87
Others (incl. Torbeš) 86
Bosniaks 15
Persons for whom data are taken from administrative sources 40

See also 
Macedonian Muslims

References

Villages in Čaška Municipality
Macedonian Muslim villages
Turkish communities in North Macedonia
Albanian communities in North Macedonia